The 2006-07 curling season began in September 2006 and ended in April 2007.

Season of Champions top three finishes
(Only team's skip listed)

Other events

CCA ranking events

Men's

Women's

WCT Money Ranking

Seasons in curling